Damascus College is Ballarat’s only Catholic co-educational secondary college. It was established after three separate Catholic colleges, St Martin's in the Pines, Sacred Heart College and St Paul's College amalgamated. The college is located on a treed 20 hectare campus in Mount Clear, 7 km from Ballarat's central business district. Damascus College is a day school for secondary students in years 7 to 12.

Origins

Sacred Heart College
In 1881, the Sisters of Mercy established Sacred Heart College in Ballarat East for students from Preparatory to Year 12.  The primary students were later moved to St Francis Xavier College in 1906.

St Paul's Technical College

When the Bishop of Ballarat, James O'Collins established St Paul's Technical College in 1948, he invited the Christian Brothers to continue their work for boys through the provision of technical education.

In 1987 the school moved from Lydiard St to the former Ballarat Orphanage on Victoria Street.

St Martin's in the Pines
Alice Fanning, who had been looked after by the Sisters of Mercy for several years, bequeathed the Mt Clear property to the Sisters of Mercy on her death in February 1960. The land was used by the Sisters to grow vegetables and raise cattle, and following the decision in 1964 to develop the site for the senior school of Sacred Heart College, the foundation stone was laid in 1966.

In 1967, the separate campus for Year 11 and 12 girls was developed at Mt Clear to form St Martin's in the Pines. In 1988, this campus became co-educational, with boys mainly from St Paul's Technical College.

Amalgamation
In 1995  Sacred Heart College, St Martin's in the Pines and St Paul's Technical College amalgamated to form Ballarat's only co-educational Catholic secondary school. Year 7 to 9 students were located in Victoria St at the former St Paul's site and Year 10 to 12 students were located in Mt Clear at the former site of St Martin's in the Pines. In 2011 all students were relocated to Mt Clear. Damascus College is jointly sponsored by the Sisters of Mercy and the parish priests of Ballarat, Ballarat East, Ballarat North, Bungaree, Cressy, Creswick, Daylesford, Gordon, Linton, Redan, Sebastopol, and Wendouree.

In 2016 the college was named the Sustainability Victoria Biodiversity Secondary School of the Year.

Curriculum 
The college's curriculum is informed by a number of key documents including the College Vision and Mission Statement, Teaching and Learning Policy, the Australian Curriculum, the Victorian Essential Learning Standards, VCAA and the Victorian Registration and Qualifications Authority.

Students have the opportunity to learn French or Indonesian from Year 7 to 12. Physical Education and Health are taken from years 7 to 10, while Religious Education is taken for all years. Damascus College offers VCE, VET and VCAL to Year 10, 11 and 12 students.

Extracurricular activities

Mercy and Justice
Timor-Leste Immersion Program - students are given the opportunity to raise funds for Timor-Leste and visit the college's sister school Santa Maria in Ainaro
Edmund Rice Camps - students are trained to become camp leaders for disadvantaged children and families
Seeds of Justice - a Mercy Schools Project which allows students to deepen their awareness of justice
Mercy Works - projects supporting local and overseas relief and development activities
Justice Action Group (JAG) and Making A Difference (MAD) - senior and junior social justice groups
Christian Personal Development Award (CPDA)

Sustainable Racing Team (SRT)
Since 1998 Damascus College students have designed, built and tested Human Powered Vehicles (HPVs). The team trains and competes annually in the RACV Energy Breakthrough challenge in Maryborough. The competition involves a 24-hour non-stop endurance race where teams gain points for the most laps travelled as well as their demonstrated knowledge of the vehicle and the technology used to make the vehicle. SRT is offered as a after-school extra-curricular activity that requires students to build the vehicles in an effort to engage them in energy efficient technologies that may make up the future of transport and manufacturing.

The college won the World Future Cycle Challenge in 2005 and 2007, a 1200 km journey from Ceduna to Adelaide.

In March 2008 Damascus College rode 1009 km in under 24 hours from Sydney to Ballarat to raise awareness of solutions to greenhouse emissions and to raise funds for sustainable energy and food programs.

In 2009, SRT rode a 3775 km journey by solar vehicle from Darwin to the steps of the Victorian State Parliament from 23 November - 9 December, just as the 2009 United Nations Climate Change Conference in Copenhagen opened. Their Outback Rode RAGE (Ride Against Greenhouse Emissions) campaign aimed to raise awareness about climate change and how individuals can reduce their environmental footprints. Seven students took turns on the hi-tech vehicle. The vehicle was 30 per cent powered by solar electricity and 70 per cent by pedalling and hit a top of 115 km/h.

Formerly known as Energy Breakthrough Team (EBT), in 2019 it was renamed to Sustainable Racing Team (SRT).

Drama
Students can join the senior or junior Drama Club, can participate in the annual production and the biannual Easter production the Final Hours.

Sport
Each year school swimming, athletics and ball sports carnivals are held for all students to participate in. Damascus College is a member of the Ballarat Associated Schools through which students can choose to represent the school in:

BAS premierships 
Damascus has won the following BAS premierships. Premierships won prior to 1995 were done so by the pre-amalgamation schools.

Combined:

 Athletics - 1995
 Badminton (2) - 2006, 2007
 Lawn Bowls - 1997

Boys:

 Badminton (4) - 2006, 2008, 2009, 2019
 Cross Country - 1990
 Soccer - 2003

Girls:

 Athletics (6) - 1971, 1972, 1973, 1974, 1977, 1995
 Badminton - 2017
 Basketball (10) - 1965, 1966, 1969, 1971, 1972, 1975, 1982, 1997, 1999, 2000
 Football (2) - 1999, 2000
Hockey - 1976
 Netball (7) - 1961, 1966, 1967, 1970, 1972, 1991, 1992
 Soccer (3) - 1999, 2000, 2003
 Softball (2) - 1965, 2008
Volleyball (2) - 1989, 1992

Other
Debating
SRC (Student Representative Council)
French and Indonesian language trips
Ski trips
 Youth-Tutoring-Youth program 
Green Group
Book Club

Campus wings 
Damascus College is divided into several school wings
Bishop Connors Wing - Year 9 and 10 classrooms named for former Bishop of Ballarat Peter Connors
Catherine McAuley Wing - Year 7 and 8 classrooms named for Sister Catherine McAuley
Genevieve McDonald Wing - Science classrooms named for Sister Genevieve McDonald
John Shannon Centre - gymnasium named in honour of first Damascus principal, John Shannon
Mercy Wing - administration and visitor reception named in honour of the Sisters of Mercy
Our Lady of Mercy Chapel
St Martin's Resource Centre - Library, named for St Martin's in the Pines
St Paul's Arts and Technology Wing - art, metal and woodwork rooms named for St Paul's Technical College
Valda Ward Auditorium - Drama auditorium and rooms named after Sister Valda Ward
Damascus Events Centre - a multipurpose building primarily for hosting events and exams

Houses 

 McAuley - Venerable Catherine McAuley founded the Sisters of Mercy, who had their formal beginnings in Ireland in 1831. In response to the needs of the time, Catherine McAuley established an institution for the care and education of less advantaged girls and young women. The congregation has continued to act in response to contemporary needs in society.
 Rice - Brother Edmund Ignatius Rice founded the Christian Brothers in Ireland in 1802 to educate the sons of poor and oppressed Catholic families. The brothers provided education by which these boys gained some control of their lives.
  Xavier - Mother Xavier Flood was one of the founding sisters of the Convent of Mercy, Ballarat East and the first principal of Sacred Heart College. 
  St Martin - Saint Martin de Porres (formerly O'Collins House) - Saint Martin de Porres was a Peruvian lay brother who was canonized in 1962, he is most remembered for his work on behalf of the poor. The house name was changed to St Martin after the Royal Commission into Institutional Responses to Child Sexual Abuse found that Bishop James O'Collins received complaints about Gerald Ridsdale but did nothing to act on them

Principals

Notable alumni

Sacred Heart College
Karen Overington (1969), Member of the Victorian Parliament for Ballarat West
 Judith Myrea Brewer (1979), Officer of the Order of Australia

St Paul's Technical College
Mick Malthouse (1971), AFL footballer and coach for Footscray, West Coast Eagles, Collingwood and Carlton
Val Perovic (1971), former AFL footballer for St Kilda and Carlton
Maurice O'Keefe (1972), AFL footballer for St Kilda and Geelong
Geoff Cunningham (1977), AFL footballer for St Kilda
Daryl Cunningham (1978), AFL footballer
Sean Simpson (1987), former AFL footballer for St Kilda and Geelong
Anthony McDonald (1990), former AFL footballer for Melbourne
James McDonald (1992) AFL footballer for Melbourne and Greater Western Sydney

St Martin's In the Pines
Helen FitzGerald (1984), novelist and screenwriter
Rachael Taylor (1994), olympic medalist for rowing

Damascus College
Darren Jolly (1996) dual AFL premiership winner with Sydney and Collingwood
Shayne Reese (2000) Olympic and Commonwealth Games swimmer
Cameron Richardson (2005), former AFL footballer for North Melbourne
James Frawley (2006) Melbourne Football Club
Jordan Roughead (2008 school captain), AFL premiership winner for the Western Bulldogs
Aislinn Prendergast (2009), orienteer for Australia
 Shaun Reeves (2011), member of band Kuchi Kopi

See also 
 Catholic All Schools Sports Association (CAS)
 Education in Ballarat
 List of schools in Victoria
 List of Christian Brothers schools
 List of schools in Ballarat
 List of high schools in Victoria
Sacred Heart College, Ballarat
 Victorian Certificate of Education

References

External links 
 Damascus College website

Educational institutions established in 1881
Catholic secondary schools in Victoria (Australia)
Ballarat Associated Schools
Sisters of Mercy schools
Schools in Ballarat
1881 establishments in Australia